Zachariah Clayton, (April 17, 1913 – November 20, 1997) was a basketball player for the New York Rens. He was also a Negro league baseball player and a professional boxing referee. He was inducted into the Naismith Memorial Basketball Hall of Fame in 2017.

As a boy, Clayton's family moved from Virginia to Philadelphia. Clayton played at the Christian Street YMCA along with Charles "Tarzan" Cooper, Jackie Bethards and Bill Yancey.  There they began four fruitful careers on a squad called the Tribune Men.  Clayton also played for the Harlem Globetrotters.  Clayton would win world championships with both teams. Clayton is enshrined in the Philadelphia basketball Hall of Fame. Clayton later became a boxing referee. His most famous bout was the 1974 Ali-Foreman "Rumble In The Jungle". Clayton also refereed Muhammad Ali's last fight, against Trevor Berbick in 1981.

References

External links
 and Baseball-Reference Black Baseball stats and Seamheads

1997 deaths
Bacharach Giants players
Baltimore Elite Giants players
Chicago American Giants players
Harlem Globetrotters players
New York Black Yankees players
New York Renaissance players
Basketball players from Philadelphia
Naismith Memorial Basketball Hall of Fame inductees
1913 births
20th-century African-American sportspeople